The Indonesian Trade Union Confederation is a national trade union center in Indonesia. It was founded in 2003 and is affiliated with the International Trade Union Confederation. The KSPI was formed by a merger of a number of ICFTU affiliated unions.

References

 Oral History on the Trade Union Movement in Indonesia Collection at the International Institute of Social History

Trade unions in Indonesia
International Trade Union Confederation
Trade unions established in 2003
2003 establishments in Indonesia